Prasun Gain (born 3 September 1977) is an Indian actor and dramatist who works in Bengali cinema and television. He is best known for his roles in Detective Byomkesh Bakshy! (2015), Alifa (2016), and Prem Amar (2009). He also played the character based on Tillius Cimber in the Bengali adaptation of William Shakespeare's Julius Caesar, Zulfiqar (2016). On television, he plays the role of Prafulla Roy in Byomkesh. Prasun Gain is currently releasing his short films on his Youtube channel.

Filmography

References

External links 

 
 Prasun Gain 

Living people
Male actors in Bengali cinema
1977 births